Giovanni Pietro Damian (born 9 January 2003), known professionally as Sangiovanni, is an Italian singer and songwriter.

In 2020, Sangiovanni took part at the 20th edition of the Italian talent show Amici di Maria De Filippi, where he won the "Singers" section and finished second overall. He debuted with the EP Sangiovanni in May 2021, which peaked at number one of FIMI's album chart.

His most successful song, "Malibu", topped the Italian single chart for four weeks and was certified seven platinum in Italy. On 4 December 2021, his participation at the Sanremo Music Festival 2022 was revealed. He finished fifth overall with the song "Farfalle".

Discography

Studio albums

EPs

Singles

Television

References

Italian singers
Living people
21st-century Italian male singers
2003 births